Oliver Abildgaard Nielsen (born 10 June 1996) is a Danish professional footballer who plays as a defensive midfielder for Italian Serie A club Hellas Verona, on loan from the Russian club Rubin Kazan.

Club career

AaB
Abildgaard was promoted to AaB's first team squad in the summer of 2015 along with Jannik Pohl from the AaB U19 squad.

On 20 July 2015, he made his first team-debut against Esbjerg at the age of 19. He was in the starting lineup and was responsible for a penalty that gave Esbjerg the lead, but he also scored the equalizing goal. The match ended 1–1. On 9 September 2015, he made his Danish Cup debut when he was in the line-up against the local rivals from Vendsyssel FF.

Rubin Kazan
On 3 February 2020, it was confirmed that Abildgaard had joined Russian club FC Rubin Kazan on a loan until 30 June 2020 with an option to buy. On 20 June 2020, AaB confirmed that Rubin activated the purchase option and Abildgaard joined Rubin on a permanent basis until 30 June 2024. 

On 1 September 2022, Abildgaard moved on loan to Celtic in Scotland for the 2022–23 season. Due to lack of playing time, Abildgaard's loan spell at Celtic was terminated and on transfer deadline day, 31 January 2023, he joined Italian Serie A club Hellas Verona on a loan-deal for the remainder of the season.

Career statistics

References

External links
 Oliver Abildgaard on AaB website
 
 

1996 births
Living people
Danish men's footballers
Danish expatriate men's footballers
Association football midfielders
Denmark international footballers
Denmark under-21 international footballers
Denmark youth international footballers
Danish Superliga players
Russian Premier League players
AaB Fodbold players
FC Rubin Kazan players
Celtic F.C. players
Hellas Verona F.C. players
Danish expatriate sportspeople in Russia
Danish expatriate sportspeople in Scotland
Danish expatriate sportspeople in Italy
Expatriate footballers in Russia
Expatriate footballers in Scotland
Expatriate footballers in Italy